Tolleshunt Major is a small village approximately five miles north east of Maldon, in the Maldon District of  Essex, England. It forms part of the electoral ward of Tolleshunt D'Arcy and is situated on the northern bank of the River Blackwater.

History

The Tolleshunt group of villages (Major, Knights, D'Arcy and Tollesbury) grew up in the area settled by the Saxon chief Toll who cleared areas of forest round local water sources.  Tolleshunta was the Anglo Saxon name for Toll's spring.  The name Tolleshunt Major (or Mauger as it was previously known), was granted by King Henry VIII to Stephen Beckenham, in 1544.  Beckenham bought various landscapes in and around the village and built a semi-fortified manor house with a turreted gatehouse within a red-brick boundary wall. This became known as "Beckingham House".  The house was demolished in 1782 and was replaced by a farmhouse. The former gatehouse which formed part of Beckingham Manor, complete with turrets and boundary wall still remain.

In 1609, Beckingham completed the design and construction of a heraldic shield which featured statuettes of himself and his wife Alvis Beckingham (née Terral). The monument was displayed at the parish church of St. Nicholas.  This has since been pulled down and scrapped.

Beckingham family
The Beckingham family originally came from Wiltshire.  Stephen's son Thomas Beckingham received a knighthood and died in 1633. His son, William, became heir to the estate aged 12. The estate was eventually sold to Sir Thomas Adams, an alderman from London. The manor house changed hands several times before eventually becoming the property of the current owners.

Geography
Tolleshunt Major's only streets are Beckingham Street, Bakers Lane, Mill Lane, Witham Road, Tudwick Road and Tolleshunt D'Arcy Road, all situated within the built up part of the village, which consists of just over one hundred dwellings.

The village's parish boundaries stretch as far as Little Totham, taking in parts of Sawyers Lane and Plains Road. Other rural parts of the village include Church Road to the east, Tudwick Road to the north, Sawyers Lane and Plains Road to the west, parts of Scraley Road, Wash Lane and Bakers Green to the south.

The village, which is not on any main road, is bordered by the villages of Little Totham, Goldhanger, Tolleshunt D'Arcy, Tolleshunt Knights and Great Totham North and South. Nearby towns include Maldon District, Colchester, Chelmsford and Tiptree.

Economy
Tolleshunt Major is host to The Beckingham Business park which has a small number of businesses, ranging from a transport company to a sports equipment manufacturing company. There are no street lights, mains gas supply or bus service apart from a schools service in the village.

The village has one public house called the Beckingham Bell which is situated in Beckingham Street.

The village does have one small shop on Wicks Manor Farm situated in Tolleshunt Major which is owned by Howies & Sons.  Wicks Manor Farm is a Local Essex farm which produces dry cured bacon, sausages, ham, gammons and pork.

Other shops can be found in Tiptree which is about a ten-minute drive where large supermarkets can be found as well as fast food restaurants, newsagents, a post office, hair salons, doctors and pharmacists. Also in Tiptree is the jam factory owned by Wilkin & Sons Limited.
Bigger shopping centres are at Chelmsford City about 30 minutes drive away and Colchester Town about 30 minutes away.

Governance
There are several elected representatives at different levels of government which act for Tolleshunt Major and the surrounding villages. There are two Tolleshunt D'arcy district councillors which represent the area at Maldon District Council.  The current district councillors are Robert Long (Conservative Party (UK)) and Maddie Thompson (Conservative). The current MEPs are Vicky Ford (Conservative), Andrew Duff (Liberal Democrats), Stuart Agnew (UK Independence), Robert Sturdy (Conservative), Geoffrey Van Orden (Conservative), Richard Howitt (Labour) and David Campbell Bannerman (Conservative).

Public transport

Bus
There is no bus service that runs through Tolleshunt Major. Buses can be boarded at the nearby village of Tolleshunt D’arcy. Other villages served are Maldon, Chelmsford and Witham.

Railway
The closest National Rail service is located in Witham or Hatfield Peveral, and is operated by Abellio Greater Anglia. Destinations served from these stations include London Liverpool Street and Ipswich, Clacton, Harwich, Braintree and Norwich via the Great Eastern Main Line.
The nearest London Underground line is the central line at Stratford International.

Schools

There are no schools in the village of Tolleshunt Major, the nearest primary school being in Tolleshunt D'arcy.

Healthcare
The nearest NHS(National Health Service (England)) hospitals are Broomfield Hospital in Chelmsford. or Colchester General, in Highwoods, Colchester.

References

External links

Tolleshunt Major Parish Council website

Villages in Essex
Maldon District